Soul Street is an album by saxophonist Jimmy Forrest compiled from four different sessions between 1960 and 1962 (with the CD edition adding a bonus track from 1958) and released on  New Jazz Some tracks appear as CD bonus tracks on other CDs but this is the only album on which the Big Band tracks appear.

Reception

AllMusic awarded the album 3 stars stating "A popular yet underrated tenor saxophonist, Jimmy Forrest is featured in several different settings".

Track listing
All compositions by Jimmy Forrest except where noted.
 "Soul Street" – 9:06
 "I Love You" (Harry Archer, Harlan Thompson) – 5:13
 "Sonny Boy" (Lew Brown, Buddy DeSylva, Ray Henderson) – 3:19
 "Soft Summer Breeze"  (Eddie Heywood, Judy Spencer) – 4:07
 "Experiment in Terror" (Henry Mancini) – 2:25
 "Just A-Sittin' and A-Rockin'" (Duke Ellington, Lee Gaines, Billy Strayhorn) – 3:56
 "That's All" (Alan Brandt, Bob Haymes) – 4:51
 "I Wanna Blow, Blow, Blow" (Jerry Valentine) – 5:53 
 Recorded at Van Gelder Studio in Hackensack, New Jersey on August 29, 1958 (track 8) and at Van Gelder Studio in Englewood Cliffs, New Jersey on September 9, 1960 (track 1), September 1, 1960 (track 7), October 19, 1960 (tracks 2 & 3), 1961 and June 1, 1962 (tracks 4-6)

Personnel
Jimmy Forrest – tenor saxophone
Art Farmer (track 8), Ernie Royal (tracks 4-6), Idrees Sulieman (track 8) – trumpet
Jimmy Cleveland (tracks 4-6), George "Buster" Cooper (track 8) – trombone
Jerome Richardson – alto saxophone, flute (track 8)
George Barrow (tracks 4-6), King Curtis (track 1), Seldon Powell (tracks 4-6) – tenor saxophone
Pepper Adams – baritone saxophone (track 8)
Ray Bryant (track 8), Gene Casey (track 1), Hugh Lawson (tracks 2, 3 & 7), Chris Woods (tracks 4-6) – piano
Tiny Grimes (track 8), Mundell Lowe (tracks 4-6), Calvin Newborn (track 7) – guitar
Richard Davis (tracks 4-6), George Duvivier (track 1), Wendell Marshall (track 8), Tommy Potter (tracks 2, 3 & 7) – bass
Roy Haynes (track 1), Osie Johnson (track 8), Clarence Johnston  (tracks 2, 3 & 7), Ed Shaughnessy (tracks 4-6) – drums
Ray Barretto – congas (tracks 2 & 3)
Oliver Nelson – tenor saxophone (track 1), arranger and conductor (tracks 4-6)
Jerry Valentine – arranger (track 8)
Esmond Edwards – supervisor
Rudy Van Gelder – engineer

References

Jimmy Forrest albums
1962 albums
Prestige Records albums
Albums recorded at Van Gelder Studio
Albums arranged by Oliver Nelson
Albums produced by Esmond Edwards